The Parish Church of St. Francis of Assisi is a Roman Catholic parish church in Montevideo, Uruguay.

Overview
Dedicated to St. Francis of Assisi, the church was originally established 2 December 1840.

Located at the intersection of the streets Cerrito and Solís of the Ciudad Vieja, it was built in the 19th century in Neo-Romanesque style by French-Uruguayan architect Victor Rabu, who was inspired by the basilica of St. Sernin, Toulouse; the building was completed in 1870.

Bibliography
 
 Guía Arquitectónica y Urbanística de Montevideo. 3rd edition. Intendencia Municipal de Montevideo, 2008, pages 50, 132.

See also
 List of Catholic churches in Uruguay

References

External links

Ciudad Vieja, Montevideo
1840 establishments in Uruguay
Roman Catholic church buildings in Montevideo
Romanesque Revival church buildings in Uruguay
Roman Catholic churches completed in 1870
19th-century Roman Catholic church buildings in Uruguay